The Edward Youde Aviary is a  aviary built over a natural valley at the southern corner of Hong Kong Park, which is located in Central at the bottom of the north eastern slope of Victoria Peak in Hong Kong. The Edward Youde Aviary was opened to the public in September 1992 and managed by the Urban Council. The aviary, largest in Southeast Asia, is named after the late Sir Edward Youde, the Governor of Hong Kong from 1982 to 1986.

The valley is bounded by an east-facing slope fully covered with natural vegetation and a west-facing slope previously occupied by a barracks.

This walk-through aviary features a collection of 600 birds representing 80 species indigenous to Southeast Asia, Indonesia, and New Guinea. Ground-dwelling birds including pheasants, leafbirds, partridges, pigeons and thrushes. Great argus pheasants proclaim their presence by ringing territorial calls and give one of the most elaborate courtship displays in the bird world.

The entrance to the aviary consists of a small rectangular building. This building holds on display different types of eggs.

Waterfowl lake

The waterfowl lake linked with Edward Youde Aviary by an inner lake is landscaped to form a swamp to accommodate different species of waterfowl. Some attractive species found in the waterfowl lake are the Australian pelican, great white pelican and radjah shelduck.

Caged display area

Some of the characteristic birds cannot be housed in the main aviary. Large hornbills predate smaller birds, they can only be seen in the three smaller display cages. Three displays let visitors view at a close range. Two cages house the white-crested hornbill and the great pied hornbill, while the other holds various species of birds of the Malesian region.

Outdoor learning activities
During the school term, park staff will conduct educational programmes for school children. Staff will also arrange guided tours for groups. However, the organizer should make prior arrangements with the office.

See also
List of urban public parks and gardens of Hong Kong
Hong Kong Zoological and Botanical Gardens

References

External links

 Top Ten Buildings of the 90s, Building Journal

Hong Kong Park
Zoos in Hong Kong
Aviaries